Highly Refined Pirates is Minus the Bear's debut full-length album, released on November 19, 2002, by Suicide Squeeze Records.

Track listing

Personnel
Jake Snider - Vocals and guitar
Dave Knudson - Guitar
Erin Tate - Drums
Cory Murchy - Bass
Matt Bayles - Electronics

Additional personnel
 Produced and Engineered by Steve Fisk
 Mixed by Steve Fisk and Troy Tietjen, except 4,7,10,12, and 14 mixed by Matt Bayles
 Mastered by Ed Brooks
 Additional vocals by Amy Blaschke on "Get Me Naked 2: Electric Boogaloo"

Trivia
Some of the song titles are quotes from the film Starship Troopers.

External links
SuicideSqueeze.net

Suicide Squeeze Records albums
2002 debut albums
Minus the Bear albums
Albums produced by Steve Fisk